Dogachhia is a census town in Barrackpore I CD Block of Barrackpore subdivision in North 24 Parganas district in the Indian state of West Bengal. It is a part of Kolkata Urban Agglomeration.

Geography

Location
Naihati, Bhatpara and Panpur are located nearby.

96% of the population of Barrackpore subdivision (partly presented in the map alongside) live in urban areas. In 2011, it had a density of population of 10,967 per km2 The subdivision has 16 municipalities and 24 census towns.

For most of the cities/ towns information regarding density of population is available in the Infobox. Population data is not available for neighbourhoods. It is available for the entire municipal area and thereafter ward-wise.

All places marked on the map are linked in the full-screen map.

Police station
Naihati police station under Barrackpore Police Commissionerate has jurisdiction over Naihati municipal area and Barrackpore I CD Block, including Barrackpur Cantonment Board.

Post Office
Dogachhia has a delivery sub post office, with PIN 743130 in the North Presidency Division of North 24 Parganas district in Calcutta region. There is no other post office with the same PIN.

Demographics
 India census, Dogachhia had a population of 5,705; of this, 2,957 are male, 2,748 female. It has an average literacy rate of 81.68%, higher than the national average of 74.04%.

Infrastructure
As per the District Census Handbook 2011, Dogachhia covered an area of 2.2037 km2. Amongst the medical facilities it had were 8 medicine shops. Amongst the educational facilities It had were 4 primary schools, 1 middle school and 1 secondary school. The nearest senior secondary school was available 5 km away at Naihati.

Transport
Dogachhia is beside Kalyani Expressway.

Naihati Junction railway station on the Sealdah-Ranaghat line is located nearby.

Healthcare
North 24 Parganas district has been identified as one of the areas where ground water is affected by arsenic contamination.

References

Cities and towns in North 24 Parganas district